Kappa TV is a Malayalam music channel from the Mathrubhumi group, the publisher of the widely circulated Mathrubhumi daily. The channel was named after Tapioca, a type of starch extracted from the root of Cassava plant, which is called "kappa" in Malayalam language. The channel focus on youth oriented programs and. Music Mojo which features bands from Kerala and other southern Indian states is a popular program in Kappa TV. The studios are located in Thiruvananthapuram and Kochi.

Main programs 
 Music Mojo
 Madras Takies
 Merry Go Round
 Buzz 25
 Bindazz Bollywood
 The Happiness Project
 Open Road
 Love Bytes
 Page 3
 Star Jam
 Tube Gride
 I Personally
 Simplyyy Naadan
 Rise and Shine
 Saturday Shuffle
 The Big League
 Film Lounge
 Big Ticket
 Smokin Hot
 Creative Chef
 Simply Naadan
Dear Kappa
Dine Out With Celebrities
Face of the week
 Medley Chutney

Earlier shows
 Get Stylish
Music Mojo season 1,2,3,4,5,6

References

External links

Malayalam-language television channels
Television stations in Thiruvananthapuram
2013 establishments in Kerala
Television channels and stations established in 2013

Music television channels in India